Francisca Clotilde (19 October 1862 – 8 December 1935) was a Brazilian writer. She was an advocate for women's rights and an abolitionist. Her most noted work was The Divorced Woman in 1902.

Life
Clotilde was born in 1862 in Tauá in north eastern Brazil. Her parents were João Correia Lima and Ana Maria Castelo Branco. She was an abolitionist, and known as an advocate for women's rights. She worked as a translator, and she published short stories, poems and articles under the pseudonym Jane Davy. She taught at the Normal School in Fortaleza from 1884 until she lost her job for her opinions. However she then opened her own day school where she continued her teaching.

She and her two daughters founded the Externato Santa Clotilde on 15 January 1891.

Her most noted work wasThe Divorced Woman which was a controversial book when it was published in 1902.

Clotilde died in Fortaleza in 1935. Her daughters were involved in her work. In 2007 Anamélia Custódio Mota published a book,Francisca Clotilde: A pioneer of Education and Literature in Ceará, about the life and work of Clotilde.

References

1862 births
1935 deaths
People from Tauá
Brazilian women writers